George Fletcher Hart (10 February 1909 – 3 June 1944) was a New Zealand rugby union player. A wing three-quarter, Hart represented  at a provincial level, and was a member of the New Zealand national side, the All Blacks, from 1930 to 1936. He played 35 matches for the All Blacks including 11 internationals, scoring a total of 28 tries.

Educated at Waitaki Boys' High School, where he played in the 1st XV rugby team in 1924 and 1925, Hart was the 1931 New Zealand national 100 yards champion, in a time of 10.4 seconds, although he finished second behind American athlete, George Simpson. He married Maisie Chambers Harris of Christchurch on 1 April 1937.

Hart served in the 2nd New Zealand Expeditionary Force in World War II, rising to the rank of captain in the 20th Armoured Regiment. He died on 3 June 1944 after being hit by a shell on the advance towards Rome after the Battle of Monte Cassino, and was buried at Cassino War Cemetery.

References

1909 births
1944 deaths
Rugby union players from Christchurch
People educated at Waitaki Boys' High School
New Zealand rugby union players
New Zealand international rugby union players
Canterbury rugby union players
Rugby union wings
New Zealand male sprinters
New Zealand military personnel killed in World War II
New Zealand Army officers
Burials at Cassino War Cemetery